Stoke Bruerne is a small village and civil parish in West Northamptonshire, England about  north of Milton Keynes and  south of Northampton.

 The civil parish population at the 2011 Census was 373.

History
Stoke Bruerne is mentioned in the Domesday Book in 1086 as "Stoche" meaning "an outlying farmstead or hamlet". The form "Stokbruer" is used in 1254 being a suffix by the "Briwere" family of the Manor House. The village is fairly typical for this area of south Northamptonshire containing many traditional stone and thatched cottages. The village's main claim to fame is its situation on the Grand Union Canal making it a favourite destination for tourists. The population is split 196 male and 199 female in 169 households (2001 census).

The parish is currently governed as part of West Northamptonshire. Before local government changes in 2021 it was part of Tove Ward, named after the River Tove, of the district council of South Northamptonshire.

The nearby country estate of Stoke Park along Shutlanger Road is occasionally open to the public in August, but all that remains of the main house are the two east and west wings known as Stoke Park Pavilions.

In December 2008, the conservation project won the East Midlands' Royal Town Planning Institute (RTPI) Award, alongside Foxton Locks, another major canal restoration project in Leicestershire, near Market Harborough.

Culture and tourism

Walks
Many public footpaths cross the area around Stoke Bruerne.  One such walk, taking in Grafton Regis, was the subject of a Daily Telegraph article.  Other walks in and around Northampton are mentioned in the County Council Right of way site.

Canal Museum

The village is home to one of the three museums owned and run by Canal & River Trust. The others are at Ellesmere Port and Gloucester Docks.

Blisworth tunnel

About half a mile north of the village is the south portal of Blisworth tunnel - accessible by a walk along the old towpath (on the eastern side of the canal - north of the village, the western side is either private property or inaccessible.) The tunnel was awarded a Transport Trust 'Red Wheel' in recognition of its industrial heritage and importance on 22-August-2014 (30th anniversary of the reopening of the tunnel in 1984). The Red Wheel is on the blacksmith's forge in Stoke Bruerne.

Facilities
There are two canalside public houses, The Boat Inn, and The Navigation, both serving a variety of meals and drinks. There is a restaurant/takeaway, The Spice of Bruerne, various bed and breakfast facilities and tearooms. The village attracts many visitors all year round and especially during the summer months. There are parking restrictions at all times, except for residents, on village roads which are all marked with double yellow lines. There is, however, a pay and display car park close to the Museum (charge £3 or 50p after 6pm). The parking restrictions are strictly enforced. A variety of boat trips may be booked from the canalside. Most of the time there is plenty of activity on the canal with boats going through the locks regularly and plenty going in and out of the tunnel.

Cricket Club 
The village has a thriving cricket club with two sides competing in the Northamptonshire Cricket League, a Sunday side and booming junior section. In 2014 Stoke Bruerne CC merged with a Northampton-based Spencer CC to form 'Spencer Bruerne Cricket Club' who are based on Rookery Lane.

Its ground is named after the late George Edward Tarry who donated the field to the village in the late 20th century. The pavilion is dedicated to his wife Elizabeth Fay Tarry, who died in the late 1960s.

Conservation area consultation 
In November 2007 the area of the village and surroundings, including Stoke Park, were the subject of an extensive conservation consultation by South Northants Council. Extensive additional documentation, including maps, pictures and historical documentation, is available from the South Northants Council's Planning website.

Railway
Stoke Bruerne had its own railway station, part of the Stratford-upon-Avon and Midland Junction Railway (SMJR) and misnamed Stoke Bruern. This ran close to the village over Blisworth tunnel near the south portal. The station building has been converted to a private house and is along the road to Blisworth just outside the village. The line of the railway, and station platform, are still visible and the Blisworth road has a railway bridge still in position near the former station. The railway ran east to join the West Coast Main Line and then into Bedfordshire.

Film
The village appears, with Blisworth, in the Ealing Studios film Painted Boats (1945), filmed at the end of World War II and directed by Charles Crichton whose notable successes include The Lavender Hill Mob (1951) and A Fish Called Wanda (1988).

References

External links
 Village website
 Location on Google maps
 Spencer Bruerne Cricket Club

Canals in England
Transport museums in England
Villages in Northamptonshire
Tourist attractions in Northamptonshire
Civil parishes in Northamptonshire
West Northamptonshire District